Liliana Allen Doll (born March 24, 1970) is a track and field athlete, who started competing for Mexico in 1998. She previously represented Cuba. She won a bronze medal at the  1991 IAAF World Indoor Championships in the 60 metres.

Career

She has participated in the 1992, 1996 and 2004 Summer Olympics. At the Pan American Games she has won three gold medals, four silver, and one bronze medal.

Achievements

External links

1970 births
Living people
People from Holguín
Mexican female sprinters
Cuban female sprinters
Olympic athletes of Cuba
Olympic athletes of Mexico
Pan American Games gold medalists for Cuba
Pan American Games silver medalists for Cuba
Pan American Games bronze medalists for Mexico
Pan American Games medalists in athletics (track and field)
Athletes (track and field) at the 1987 Pan American Games
Athletes (track and field) at the 1991 Pan American Games
Athletes (track and field) at the 1995 Pan American Games
Athletes (track and field) at the 1999 Pan American Games
Athletes (track and field) at the 2003 Pan American Games
Athletes (track and field) at the 1992 Summer Olympics
Athletes (track and field) at the 1996 Summer Olympics
Athletes (track and field) at the 2004 Summer Olympics
World Athletics Championships athletes for Cuba
World Athletics Championships athletes for Mexico
World Athletics Indoor Championships medalists
Cuban emigrants to Mexico
Universiade medalists in athletics (track and field)
Central American and Caribbean Games gold medalists for Cuba
Competitors at the 1990 Central American and Caribbean Games
Competitors at the 1993 Central American and Caribbean Games
Competitors at the 2002 Central American and Caribbean Games
Goodwill Games medalists in athletics
Central American and Caribbean Games gold medalists for Mexico
Universiade gold medalists for Cuba
Universiade silver medalists for Cuba
Central American and Caribbean Games medalists in athletics
Medalists at the 1989 Summer Universiade
Medalists at the 1993 Summer Universiade
Competitors at the 1994 Goodwill Games
Medalists at the 1987 Pan American Games
Medalists at the 1991 Pan American Games
Medalists at the 1995 Pan American Games
Medalists at the 2003 Pan American Games
Olympic female sprinters